
This is a list of players who graduated from the Nike Tour in 1997. The top 15 players on the Nike Tour's money list in 1997 earned their PGA Tour card for 1998.

*PGA Tour rookie for 1998.

T = Tied
Green background indicates the player retained his PGA Tour card for 1999 (won or finished inside the top 125).
Yellow background indicates player did not retain his PGA Tour card for 1999, but retained conditional status (finished between 126–150).
Red background indicates the player did not retain his PGA Tour card for 1999 (finished outside the top 150).

Winners on the PGA Tour in 1998

Runners-up on the PGA Tour in 1998

See also
1997 PGA Tour Qualifying School graduates

References
Money list

Korn Ferry Tour
PGA Tour
Nike Tour graduates
Nike Tour graduates